The Don Gaspar Historic District is a historic district in Santa Fe, New Mexico. It was listed on the National Register of Historic Places in 1983. The listing included 278 contributing buildings.

History 
The district is primarily residential, and was largely built up in the early-20th century, although it was apparently subdivided in the late 19th century, and at least a few of the buildings date from this earlier period.

Architecture 
The oldest houses are one-story adobe structures. It extends south from the State Capitol, and is part of the South Capitol area of Santa Fe. The northern boundary is Paseo de Peralta, the eastern boundary is the Old Santa Fe Trail, the southern boundary is Houghton Street, and the western boundary is Don Cubero.

The mix of architectural styles includes California Bungalow, late-period Victorian and Pueblo Revival homes. Some of the homes are at least partially constructed from "pen tile," structural tiles manufactured by the inmates of the New Mexico Penitentiary, which was formerly located near the southwest end of the neighborhood. The district is transected by Don Gaspar Avenue and Galisteo Street, which run north–south.

See also

National Register of Historic Places listings in Santa Fe County, New Mexico

References

Santa Fe, New Mexico
Historic districts on the National Register of Historic Places in New Mexico
Geography of Santa Fe County, New Mexico
History of Santa Fe County, New Mexico
Residential buildings on the National Register of Historic Places in New Mexico
Northern Rio Grande National Heritage Area
National Register of Historic Places in Santa Fe, New Mexico